Ibrahim Sesay may refer to:

 Ibrahim Kemoh Sessay (fl. 2002-present), Sierra Leonean politician
 Ibrahim Sesay (footballer) (born 2004), Sierra Leonean footballer
 Ibrahim Sesay (politician) (died 2019), Sierra Leonean politician